Upsilon Andromedae e is the proposed outermost extrasolar planet orbiting the star Upsilon Andromedae in the constellation of Andromeda. If it exists, this planet would be one of the most Jupiter-like exoplanets found in terms of mass and semi-major axis. However, subsequent studies have found that the apparent planetary signal is more likely to be an instrumental artifact.

Discovery
This planet was discovered on November 22, 2010, but the discovery paper was not released until December 2. It was the fourth time in 2010 that a fourth planet has been discovered in a planetary system, the others being Gliese 876 e, HD 10180 e, and HR 8799 e; in no earlier year during the exoplanet era had more than one fourth planet been discovered.

Subsequent studies in 2011 and 2014, while finding some evidence for a fourth planet, found large inconsistencies in the estimated orbital period of Upsilon Andromedae e depending on what dataset was used, suggesting that the apparent planetary signal is more likely to be an instrumental artifact.

Astronomers initially thought that a fourth planet in this system could not exist because it would have made the planetary system unstable and would have been ejected. But in 2007, an island region of stability was reported where a fourth planet could exist.

Characteristics
Although only the minimum mass is determined since inclination is not yet known, its true mass might be much greater. It would take over a decade to orbit the star. At an eccentricity of 0.00536, the planet's orbit would be more circular than that of any of the planets in the Solar System.

See also
HIP 11915 b – another Jupiter analog discovered in 2015

References

Upsilon Andromedae
Exoplanets discovered in 2010
Exoplanets detected by radial velocity
Giant planets
Exoplanet candidates